Reedville is an unincorporated community in Caldwell County, in the U.S. state of Texas.  It is located within the Greater Austin metropolitan area.

History
William Pettus was given a land grant by the Mexican government in 1831. Soon after, Jonathan Ellison purchased  of land from Pettus at an auction held in 1846 and it went to Ellison's children after he died in 1878. His daughter, Margaret Elizabeth Ellison, married Major A. Reed, a Confederate cavalryman. The Missouri, Kansas, and Texas railroad laid tracks through his farm and the community became a shipping port for cotton in 1887. A post office was established at Reedville in 1890 and remained in operation until 1918. A corn mill, gin, and general store were located in the settlement in 1896 and it had a population of 100. In the late 1940s, there were only two buildings and several scattered buildings in the community. There was a gin, a community hall, a few homes, two mobile home parks, and a cemetery in Reedville in the 1990s. The cemetery was maintained by a church in nearby Martindale called the Immaculate Heart of Mary Catholic Church.

Geography

Education
In 1905, Reedville had two schools that had a combined total of three teachers and 102 students. They then joined with the San Marcos Consolidated Independent School District (CISD) in neighboring Hays County in 1949. The community is still served by the San Marcos Consolidated Independent School District.

References

Unincorporated communities in Caldwell County, Texas
Unincorporated communities in Texas